Asch may refer to:

People
Asch (surname)
Asch., taxonomic author abbreviation of Paul Friedrich August Ascherson (1834–1913), German botanist

Places
 Aš, Czech Republic
 Asch (Netherlands), a village

Other uses
 Asch the Bloody, a character in Tales of the Abyss
 American Society of Church History
 American Society of Clinical Hypnosis
 Äsch or Aesch, another name for the European grayling (Thymallus vulgaris)

See also
 Asche (disambiguation)
 Asch conformity experiments
 Van Asch Deaf Education Centre
 
 

 Asc (disambiguation)
 Ash (disambiguation)